Eucalyptus prava, commonly known as orange gum, is a species of small to medium-sized tree that is endemic to eastern Australia. It has smooth, mottled bark, lance-shaped or curved adult leaves, flower buds in groups of seven, white flowers and cup-shaped or hemispherical fruit.

Description
It has smooth, mottled grey, orange and reddish brown bark. Flowering has been observed in January and the flowers are white.

Taxonomy and naming
Eucalyptus prava was first formally described in 1990 by Lawrie Johnson and Ken Hill in the journal Telopea from material collected by Roger Coveny near Torrington in 1973. The specific epithet (prava) is from the Latin pravus meaning "crooked", referring to the habit of this species.

Distribution and habitat
Orange gum grows in woodland, usually in poor skeletal soils derived from granite or sandstone. It is found north from Moonbi in New South Wales to Wallangarra and to Stanthorpe in Queensland.

Conservation status
This eucalypt is classified as "least concern" under the Queensland Government Nature Conservation Act 1992.

References

prava
Myrtales of Australia
Flora of New South Wales
Trees of Australia
Plants described in 1990